Doboka County was a county in Transylvania between the 11th or 12th century and 1876.

Kingdom of Hungary counties in Transylvania